Love '47 is a 1949 German drama film directed by Wolfgang Liebeneiner and starring Dieter Horn, Hilde Krahl and Sylvia Schwarz. It was part of the cycle of rubble films made in post-war Germany. A young man and a woman about to commit suicide by jumping into a river, recount to each other their experiences of the Second World War and the struggles of the immediate post-war situation. Eventually they convince each other that life is worth living after all.

The film was shot at the Göttingen Studios with sets designed by the art director Walter Haag. It was partly based on the play Draußen vor der Tür by Wolfgang Borchert, with many extra scenes added showing the experience of a woman on the home front whereas the original stage work had concentrated only on the perspectives of soldiers coming home. The film is particularly notable for its sympathetic treatment of its female protagonist.

Cast
 Dieter Horn as Jürgen Gehrke
 Hilde Krahl as Anna Gehrke
 Sylvia Schwarz as Monika Gehrke
 Karl John as Beckmann
 Erika Müller as Lisa Beckmann
 Hedwig Wangel as Mutter Beckmann
 Grethe Weiser as Frau Puhlmann
 Luise Franke-Booch as Frau Kramer
 Albert Florath as Unternehmer
 Erich Ponto as Alter Mann
 Hubert von Meyerinck as Direktor Engelbrecht
 Paul Hoffmann as Oberst
 Leonore Esdar as Frau des Obersts
 Gisela Burghardt as Tochter des Oberst
 Herbert Tiede as Schwiegersohn des Obersts
 Leopold von Ledebur as General
 Heinz Klevenow as Ein Panzermann
 Rudolf Kalvius as Von Wehrzahn
 Helmuth Rudolph as Alfred
 Kurt A. Jung as Peter
 Erwin Geschonneck as Kriminalbeamter
 Inge Meysel as Betty aus Berlin
 Alice Verden as Tante Eva
 Tilo von Berlepsch as Vetter Fritz

References

Bibliography
 Shandley, Robert R. Rubble Films: German Cinema in the Shadow of the Third Reich. Temple University Press, 2001.

External links

1949 films
1949 drama films
German drama films
West German films
1940s German-language films
Films directed by Wolfgang Liebeneiner
Films set in Hamburg
Films set in 1947
Films about Nazi Germany
German films based on plays
German black-and-white films
1940s German films
Films shot at Göttingen Studios